A Therapy is a 2012 comedy short film created by Prada to promote their brand. The short was written and directed by Roman Polanski and stars Ben Kingsley and Helena Bonham Carter.

Premise
A female patient walks into a therapist's office, dressed head to toe in Prada design. She lies down on the couch and begins to talk about her problems, completely unaware of the therapist's growing obsession with her fur coat.

Cast
 Ben Kingsley as Therapist
 Helena Bonham Carter as Patient

Reception
The short was shown at the Cannes Film Festival and received strong applause and praise from the audience there, as part of the Cannes Classic section. The short film was later released on Prada's official website.

Filming
The short was filmed in Paris, France and director Roman Polanski had the following to say about the experience:
"A game, a thought, that through friendship and mutual respect has become true. When I was asked to shoot a short movie for Prada, I did not think that I could really be myself, but the reality is that in the total freedom I was given, I had the opportunity to reunite my favorite group of people on set and just have fun.

The chance to dwell on what the fashion world represents nowadays and the fact that it is accompanied by so many stereotypes is fascinating and at the same time a bit upsetting, but you definitely can not ignore it.

It's very refreshing to know that there are still places open to irony and wit and, for sure, Prada is one of them."

References

External links
 
 

Films directed by Roman Polanski
Films with screenplays by Roman Polanski
2012 short films
2012 films
Films scored by Alexandre Desplat
2012 comedy films
2010s English-language films